The 2015 Arizona Wildcats football team represented the University of Arizona in the 2015 NCAA Division I FBS football season. It marked the Wildcats's 116th overall season, 38th as a member of the Pac-12 Conference and its 5th within the Pac-12 South Division. The team was led by head coach Rich Rodriguez, in his fourth year, and played its home games at Arizona Stadium in Tucson, AZ for the 87th straight year. They finished the season 7–6, 3–6 in Pac-12 play to finish in fifth place in the South Division. They were invited to the New Mexico Bowl where they defeated New Mexico.

Before the season

Previous season

Led by Rich Rodriguez in his third year as head coach, the Arizona Wildcats finished the 2014 regular season with a 10–4 record (7–2 in Pac-12 play), marking the second time the program had ten wins in a season.  They won the Pac-12 South Division for the first time in school history, thereby advancing to the Wildcats' first Pac-12 Football Championship Game, where they faced the Oregon Ducks at Levi's Stadium in Santa Clara, California before losing 51–13. The Wildcats played in one of the New Year's Six bowls in the first year of the College Football Playoff with a berth in the 2014 Fiesta Bowl, the school's third major bowl appearance, where they faced the Boise State Broncos, losing 38–30.

Recruiting class
The Wildcats would go on to land another top 10 recruiting class in 2015 (#41 by Scout, #41 by Rivals, #39 by ESPN, and #41 by 247).

The Wildcats would also add two transfer players: graduate student David Catalano (OL) from San José State who is able to play immediately, as well as John Kenny (LB) from Iowa who sit out two years to satisfy the NCAA's transfer rule.

		

	

Grayshirt

Early Enrollees

Returning starters
Returning players that started all or a significant number of games in the 2014 season. Arizona returns 30 starters (including fifteen on offense, twelve on defense, and three on special teams).

Offense

Defense

Special teams

† Indicates player was a starter in 2014 but missed all of 2015 due to injury and Carter Wood will end of his career of the season due to injury.

Departures
The Wildcats would lose 20 seniors to graduation as well as no juniors who would choose to forgo their senior season in pursuit of an earlier NFL career. The Wildcats would lose five more players from the 2014 team due to various reasons.

Transfers
David Catalano (from San José State)
John Kenny (from Iowa)
Jarek Hilgers (from Arizona State)
Jack Kness-Knezinskis (from Scottsdale CC)

Offense
Connor Brewer (to Virginia)
Jordan Poland (to Arizona Western CC)
Kaelin DeBoskie

Defense
 Yamen Sanders (to Montana)
 Timmy Hamilton (to Kansas)

Spring football

Winter/Spring 2015 "way-too-early" pre-season rankings from most major sports news outlets, issued after the end of the 2014 season tabbed the 2015 Arizona Wildcats at No. 13 (ESPN-Martin Rickman), #14 (Sports Illustrated), #17 (CBSSports), and #13 (ESPN-Mark Schlabach).

Fall Camp
In July, the defending Pac-12 South champions Arizona Wildcats were picked to finish at fourth place in the Pac-12 preseason polls. Arizona was ranked No. 22 in both the preseason Amway (USA Today) Coaches Poll and the preseason AP Poll., with the first practice scheduled for Wednesday, Aug. 5. Camp practices are generally closed to the media and public, unless otherwise announced.

Depth chart

Depth Chart Source: 2015 Arizona Wildcats Football Fact Book

Personnel

Coaching staff
Coaching Staff Sources: ArizonaWildcats.com

Roster

Regular season

Schedule
The 2015 Pac-12 schedule was officially released on September 16, 2014. On April 10, 2015, the Wildcats will play the White and Navy Blue game, the program's annual spring game. Arizona Wildcats will play four of nine games, against all four North Division schools: Oregon State, Stanford, Washington and Washington State. They will also play against five South Division opponents: Arizona State, Colorado, USC, UCLA and Utah. For their non-conference slate the Wildcats will play two of three games against UTSA of the Conference USA, Nevada of the Mountain West Conference and Northern Arizona of the FCS' Big Sky Conference. For the first year,  the Cats face neither California and Oregon. The Wildcats will play all twelve games without a bye week for first time ever.

The Wildcats opened the 2015 season with a non-conference trip to Reno, Nevada, to face Nevada, its first since 1921, and is the return game in a home-and-home series that brought the Wolf Pack to Tucson in 2014. In other non-conference action, Arizona hosted in-state foe: Northern Arizona.

Schedule Source: FBschedules.com

Game summaries

vs UTSA Roadrunners

To open up the season, Arizona will host UTSA (for the third time) for its first nonconference game and first home opener of the 2015 season at Arizona Stadium in Tucson, AZ. Last season, Arizona won the previous meeting, 26–23 at Alamodome in San Antonio, TX. Arizona lead the all-time series with 2–0.

@ Nevada Wolf Pack

Following its game against UTSA, Arizona will host Nevada (for the sixth time) for its first true road non-conference game at Mackay Stadium in Reno, NV. Last season. Arizona won the previous meeting, 35–28 at Arizona Stadium in Tucson, AZ. Arizona lead the all-time series with 3–1–1.

vs Northern Arizona Lumberjacks

Following its game against Nevada, will close out the third non-conference game of the 2015 season and second home game, Arizona will host NAU for the fourteenth time. In 2013, Arizona won the previous meeting, 35–0 at Arizona Stadium in Tucson, AZ. Arizona lead the all-time series 12–1.

vs #9 UCLA Bruins

At Arizona Stadium, Tucson

After its final non-conference game against NAU, Arizona will begin the Pac-12 portion of its schedule against UCLA (for thirty-ninth time) at first home conference game of the 2015 season.

In a Pac-12 South showdown that prompted College GameDay to pay its second visit to the University of Arizona campus for the first time since 2009. The Fans and the Arizona Wildcats players all wore red with the intent to "Red Out UCLA".

Last season, UCLA won the previous meeting, 17–7 at the Rose Bowl in Pasadena, CA. UCLA lead the all-time series 22–15–2.

@ Stanford Cardinal

Following its game against UCLA, Arizona will host the Stanford (for thirty-sixth time) on the first road conference game of the 2015 season. In 2012, Stanford won the previous meeting 54–48 in OT at Stanford Stadium in Stanford, CA. Two school programs tied the all-time series with 14-14.

vs Oregon State Beavers

Following its game against Stanford, Arizona will host the Oregon State (for the thirty-seventh time) at home. In 2012, Oregon State won the previous meeting, 38–35 at Arizona Stadium in Tucson, AZ. Arizona lead the all-time series 21-14-1.

@ Colorado Buffaloes

Following its game against Oregon State, Arizona will host the Colorado (for the eighteenth time) on the road at Folsom Field in Boulder, CO. Last season, Arizona won the previous meeting 38–20 at Arizona Stadium in Tucson, AZ. Colorado lead all-time series 13–4.

vs Washington State Cougars

Following its game against Colorado, Arizona will host the Washington State (for the forty-first time) at home for the Homecoming game. Arizona won the previous meeting, 59–27 at Martin Stadium in Pullman, WA. Arizona lead the all-time series 26-14-1.

@ Washington Huskies (Halloween) 

Following its game against Washington State, Arizona will host the Washington (for the thirty-first time) on the road at Husky Stadium in Seattle, WA. Last season, Arizona won the previous meeting 27–26 in a game-winning field goal attempt at Arizona Stadium in Tucson, AZ. Washington lead all-time series 19-11-1.

@ USC Trojans

Following its game against Washington, Arizona will host the USC (for the thirty-ninth time) on the road at Los Angeles Memorial Coliseum in Los Angeles, CA. Last season, USC won the previous meeting 28–26 at Arizona Stadium in Tucson, AZ. USC lead all-time series 30–8.

vs Utah Utes

Following its game against USC, Arizona will play its final home conference game of the 2015 season  against Utah (for the 40th time). Last season, Arizona won the previous meeting by a score of 42–10 at Rice-Eccles Stadium in Salt Lake City, UT. Utah lead the all-time series 20–18–2.

@ Arizona State Sun Devils - Territorial Cup

Following its home finale against Utah, Arizona will face Arizona State (for the eighty-ninth time) in the 116th meeting of "The Territorial Cup" on a road finale. Arizona won the previous meeting and clinch the 2014 Pac-12 South title, 42–35 at Arizona Stadium in Tucson, AZ. Arizona lead the all-time series 48–39–1.

vs New Mexico Lobos - New Mexico Bowl

Following its road finale against Arizona State, Arizona will face New Mexico (for the sixty-seventh time) in the New Mexico Bowl on a 2015 season finale. Arizona won the previous meeting, 20–14 at Tucson in 1997 and loss the previous meeting, 36–28 at University Stadium in Albuquerque, NM in 2008. Arizona lead the all-time series 43-20–3.

Rankings

Statistics

Team
As of 09/04/2015.

Non-conference opponents

Pac-12 opponents

Score total by Quarters

Offense

Defense
{| style="width:90%; text-align:center;" class="wikitable collapsible collapsed"
|-
! colspan="16"| Defense Statistics
|-
! # !! NAME !! POS !! SOLO !! AST !! TOT !! TFL-YDS !! SACKS !! INT-YDS/TD !! BU !! PD !! QBH !! FR–YDS !! FF !! BLK !! SAF
|-
| 7 || Jamar Allah || S ||  ||  || ||  –  || – || 2–25-0  || ||  || – || – || – || – || –
|-
| 12 || Demetrius Flannigan-Fowles || FS ||  ||  || ||  –  || – || 1–0-0  || ||  || – || – || – || – || –
|-
| 28 || Anthony Lopez || FS ||  ||  || ||  –  || – || 1–23-1  || ||  || – || – || – || – || –
|-
| 3 || Cam Denson || CB || || ||  ||  ||  –  ||  2–21-1 ||  ||  || – ||  || – || – || – 
|-
| 42 || Anthony Fotu || DL || ||  ||  ||  –  ||  –  || 1-0–0 ||  || – ||  || – || – || – || -
|-
| 19 || DaVonte' Neal || CB || ||  ||  ||  –  ||  –  || 1–0-0 || || – ||  || – || – || – || –
|-
| || TOTAL || ||   ||   ||   ||  –  ||   –  ||  8–69-2  ||   ||   ||   ||  –  ||   || – || –|}
Key: POS: Position, SOLO: Solo Tackles, AST: Assisted Tackles, TOT: Total Tackles, TFL: Tackles-for-loss, SACK: Quarterback Sacks, INT: Interceptions, BU: Passes Broken Up, PD: Passes Defended, QBH: Quarterback Hits, FF: Forced Fumbles, FR: Fumbles Recovered, BLK: Kicks or Punts Blocked, SAF: Safeties

Special teams

Awards and honors

Preseason awards

Preseason All-Americans
Arizona had nine players selected as Preseason All-Americans going into the season. Anu Solomon was largely recognized on the second team of those organizations which published preseason lists. Cayleb Jones and Scooby Wright III were recognized as unanimous Preseason All-Americans, with Jones being selected to the first team of every publication.

Award watch lists

Conference awards

Award semifinalists Players  Casey Skowron - Campbell Trophy

Player of the Week honors
 Week 1
Cayman bundage – Offensive Player of the Week
DaVonte’ Neal – Special Teams Player of the Week
Branden leon – Scout Offensive Player of the Week 
Kevin Hamlett Jr./Malcolm Holland – Co-Scout Defensive Player of the Week
De’Andre Miller – Hard Edge Player of the Week
Reggie gilbert – Student Player of the Week

 Week 2
Nick wilson – Offensive Player of the Week
Reggie gilbert – Defensive Player of the Week
Will parks/jamar allah – Co-Special Teams Player of the Week
Zach werlinger – Scout Offensive Player of the Week 
Isaiah strong/carrington vaughn – Co-Scout Defensive Player of the Week
Cayman bundage – Hard Edge Player of the Week 
Shun brown – Student of the Week
Anthony Lopez– Community Service Award

 Week 3
Anu Solomon - Offensive Player of the Week 
Sani Fuimaono - Defensive Player the Week
Casey Skowron - Special Teams Player of the Week
Cedric Peterson - Scout Offensive Player of the Week
John Kenny - Scout Defensive Player of the Week
Albert Green - Scout Special Teams Player of the Week
Jerrard Randall - Hard Edge Player of the Week 
RJ Morgan - Student of the Week 
Jake Matthews - Community Service Award

 Week 6
Layth Freikh - Offensive Player of the Week 
Will Parks - Defensive Player the Week
Drew Riggleman  - Special Teams Player of the Week
Nathan Eldridge  - Scout Offensive Player of the Week
Malik Moody  - Scout Defensive Player of the Week
Nick Fadelli  - Scout Special Teams Player of the Week
Jamardre Cobb  - Hard Edge Player of the Week 
Shariff Williams  - Student of the Week 
David Catalano  - Community Service Award

 Week 7
Jared Baker - Offensive Player of the Week 
Reggie Gilbert (2x) - Defensive Player the Week
Cody Creason  - Scout Offensive Player of the Week
Samir Hinn  - Scout Defensive Player of the Week
Anthony Mariscal  - Scout Special Teams Player of the Week
Nate Phillips/Jerrard Randall  - Co-Hard Edge Player of the Week 
Jacob Alsadek  - Student of the Week

 Week 11

 Week 12

 * Week 13
N/A

 * Week 14
N/A

 Bye

All-Americans
Each year several publications release lists of their ideal "team". The athletes on these lists are referred to as All-Americans. The NCAA recognizes five All-American lists. They are the Associated Press (AP), American Football Coaches Association (AFCA), Football Writers Association of America (FWAA), Sporting News (SN), and the Walter Camp Football Foundation (WCFF). If a player is selected to the first team of three publications he is considered a consensus All-American, if a player is selected to the first team of all five publications he is considered a unanimous All-American.

Key:
First team
Consensus All-American
Unanimous All-American

Pac-12 All-Conference team
The Wildcats had TBA players honored as members of the 2015 Pac-12 All-Conference team, with TBA each on the first and second teams, respectively. TBA other Wildcats earned honorable mention honors.First TeamSecond TeamHonorable MentionAll-Academic teams

NCAA Academic All-Americans

Pac-12 Conference All-Academic players
The Wildcats had TBA players selected to the Pac-12 Conference All-Academic Second Team, TBA players granted honorable mention and no players selected to the First Team. In order to be eligible for the academic team a player must maintain a minimum 3.0 overall grade-point average and play in at least 50 percent of their team's games.First teamSecond TeamHonorable Mention'''

Postseason

NFL draft
The following members of 2015 Arizona Wildcats football team were selected in the 2016 NFL Draft.

NFL Scouting Combine
TBA members of the 2015 team were invited to participate in drills at the 2016 NFL Scouting Combine.

† Top performer

Media affiliates

Radio

ESPN Radio – (ESPN Tucson 1490 AM & 104.09 FM) – Nationwide (Dish Network, Sirius XM, TuneIn radio and iHeartRadio)
KCUB 1290 AM – Football Radio Show – (Tucson, AZ)
KHYT – 107.5 FM (Tucson, AZ)
KTKT 990 AM  – La Hora de Los Gatos (Spanish)'' – (Tucson, AZ)
KGME 910 AM – (IMG Sports Network) – (Phoenix, AZ)
KTAN 1420 AM – (Sierra Vista, AZ)
KDAP 96.5 FM (Douglas, Arizona)
KWRQ 102.3 FM – (Safford, AZ/Thatcher, AZ)
KIKO 1340 AM – (Globe, AZ)
KVWM 970 AM – (Show Low, AZ/Pinetop-Lakeside, AZ)
XENY 760 – (Nogales, Sonora) (Spanish)

TV
KOLD  (CBS)
KGUN (ESPN College Football on ABC/ABC)
FOX (Fox Sports Media Group)
FS1 (Fox Sports Media Group) 
ESPN (ESPN Family)
ESPN2 (ESPN Family)
ESPNU (ESPN Family)
CBS Sports Network
Pac-12 Network (Pac-12 Arizona)

References

Arizona
Arizona Wildcats football seasons
New Mexico Bowl champion seasons
2015 in sports in Arizona